Marco Antonio Capetillo Hernández (born 17 February 1976 in Mexico City, Mexico) is a Mexican former football player who played as striker. He made his professional debut with Club América on 12 March 1995, coming on as a substitute against Toros Neza.

External links
 
 
 

1976 births
Living people
Footballers from Mexico City
Association football forwards
Mexican footballers
Club América footballers
Atlante F.C. footballers
Club Puebla players
Club Necaxa footballers
Lagartos de Tabasco footballers
Lobos BUAP footballers